
In basketball, a steal is the act of legally gaining possession of the ball by a defensive player who causes the opponent to turn the ball over. The top 25 highest steals totals in National Collegiate Athletic Association (NCAA) Division I men's basketball history are listed below. The NCAA did not split into its current divisions format until August 1973. From 1906 to 1955, there were no classifications to the NCAA nor its predecessor, the Intercollegiate Athletic Association of the United States (IAAUS). Then, from 1956 to spring 1973, colleges were classified as either "NCAA University Division (Major College)" or "NCAA College Division (Small College)". Steals are a relatively new statistic in college basketball, having only become an official statistic beginning with the 1985–86 season.

The all-time Division I steals leader is Jacob Gilyard of Richmond. He recorded 466 steals by utilizing an extra year of eligibility granted by the NCAA due to the COVID-19 pandemic.

Three schools have two different players representing them on the top 25 list. Providence, which has the second- and third-ranked players on the list, is followed by Alabama A&M and Maryland.

Key

Top 25 career steals leaders

Includes ties for 25th.

References
General

Specific

NCAA Division I men's basketball statistical leaders